Yevgeny Vladimirovich Yatsky (born 26 March 1997) is a Russian football player.

Club career
He made his debut in the Russian Football National League for FC Akron Tolyatti on 12 August 2020 in a game against FC Torpedo Moscow.

References

External links
 
 Profile by Russian Football National League
 

1997 births
Sportspeople from Samara Oblast
People from Oktyabrsk
Living people
Russian footballers
Association football midfielders
FC Sokol Saratov players
FC Chayka Peschanokopskoye players
FC Akron Tolyatti players
FC Akzhayik players
FC Volga Ulyanovsk players
Russian First League players
Russian Second League players
Kazakhstan Premier League players
Russian expatriate footballers
Expatriate footballers in Kazakhstan
Russian expatriate sportspeople in Kazakhstan